Manuel Noveno Mamba Sr. (born August 19, 1958) is a Filipino politician who is the current provincial governor of Cagayan. He was elected to the House of Representatives of the Philippines, representing the 3rd District of Cagayan. First elected in 1995, he was re-elected in 2001, 2004, and 2007. He was also a municipal mayor of Tuao, Cagayan, from 1988 to 1995.

He also served as the Presidential Legislative Liaison Officer.

Personal life
He is a son of the late Congressman Francisco K. Mamba Sr. and Mrs. Estela Noveno Mamba. He is married to Atty. Mabel Villarica–Mamba, former chairperson and chief executive officer of the National Youth Commission and former director of the Philippine Charity Sweepstakes Office. They have two sons.

He, as well as his brothers, William and Francisco Jr., served as mayor of Tuao, Cagayan.

A graduate of the University of Santo Tomas, Mamba is a physician by profession. He became licensed in 1983.

Political career

As provincial board member and municipal mayor
Mamba began his political career in 1987 when he became a member of the Cagayan Provincial Board. He was the mayor of his hometown, Tuao, from 1988 to 1995.

As district representative
Mamba represented the third district of Cagayan in the House of the Representatives within four terms (1995–1998, 2001–2010).

In 2001, an election protest against Mamba was filed by his rival, outgoing Rep. Rodolfo Aguinaldo, with the House of Representatives Electoral Tribunal due to accusations of vote-buying and terrorism. Aguinaldo died later in an ambush.

His re-election in 2007 became the subject of complaint of then Tuguegarao city mayor Randolph Ting who had accused Mamba of manipulating the results, as the Parish Pastoral Council for Responsible Voting reported discrepancies in election results from certain precincts in Tuao. Mamba, as well as his allies in the province, allegedly led the tallies by big margins.

Between 2010 and 2016
During the administration of Benigno Aquino III, Mamba was appointed in 2013 as a member of the Presidential Cabinet. He was used to be the Presidential Legislative Liaison Officer and also served as the Presidential Adviser on Legislative Affairs.

As provincial governor
In 2016, Mamba, ran under Liberal Party, was elected Cagayan governor. He was re-elected in 2019 (ran independent) and again, in 2022 (ran under Nacionalista Party).

A long-time LP member, Mamba eventually joined PDP–Laban during the Duterte administration. In the 2022 elections, he filed his candidacy under NP when his lone rival, Ma. Zarah Rose Lara, filed hers under the PDP–Laban (Cusi faction).

Under his administration, he initiated programs including the Cagayan Development Agenda (Caganda 2025), "No Barangay, No Town Left Behind", and the Cagayan River Restoration Project. Meanwhile, for his efforts to maintain peace and order in the province, in 2019, Mamba was recognized as a Kapayapaan Awardee, while the Provincial Government of Cagayan became a National Awardee in the Anti-Drug Abuse Council Performance Audit.

Cases filed against Mamba
In 2016, one of his opponents, Cristina Antonio, filed an election protest against Mamba on allegations of massive fraud in the May elections, but was later dismissed by the Commission on Elections (COMELEC) Second Division as it was declared "insufficient in form and content."

On December 15, 2022, the COMELEC Second Division released a resolution, promulgated a day prior, disqualifying Mamba from the Cagayan gubernatorial elections he had won in May, citing his violation of the 45-day election ban on public fund use. The petition was filed by Lara, his opponent. Mamba was the second incumbent governor to be given such order, after Noel Rosal of Albay, who was disqualified with finality in November over a similar offense.

However, the said order was later reversed by the COMELEC en banc, thus dismissing the petition. Its resolution, issued on March 6, 2023, cited lack of jurisdiction, provided that once a winning candidate has been proclaimed, any petition for the disqualification is prohibited by the existing laws. Thus, the petition by Lara, considered filed more than six hours after the proclamation of Mamba, can no longer be heard.

References

 
 

|-

|-

1958 births
Living people
Advisers to the President of the Philippines
Benigno Aquino III administration cabinet members
20th-century Filipino medical doctors
Liberal Party (Philippines) politicians
Members of the House of Representatives of the Philippines from Cagayan
Mayors of places in Cagayan
University of Santo Tomas alumni
Governors of Cagayan
21st-century Filipino politicians